Mitzie is the given name of the following people
Mitzie Collins (born 1941), British and American traditional musician
Mitzie Hunter (born 1971), Canadian provincial politician in Ontario
Mitzie Jessop Taase, American Samoan attorney

See also
 Mitzi